General elections to the Cortes Generales were held in Spain on April 3, 1872. At stake were all 391 seats in the Congress of Deputies. The Conservative-Constitutional coalition (political heir of the Progressive-Liberal coalition in the previous elections) won the elections.

History
General elections of Spain of 1872 were held on April 8 under universal male suffrage. The elections were held during the brief reign of Amadeo I, once the Constitution of 1869 was approved. Práxedes Mateo Sagasta, a member of the  Constitutional Party (part of the Conservative-Constitutional coalition), was the prime minister before the elections.

Results

References

 CONGRESO DE LOS DIPUTADOS - HISTORICO DE DIPUTADOS 1810-1977
 Elecciones Cortes Constituyentes - 3 de abril de 1872

1872 elections in Spain
General elections in Spain
April 1872 events